Kartoos is a 1999 Indian Hindi action thriller film directed by Mahesh Bhatt and starring Sanjay Dutt, Jackie Shroff and Manisha Koirala. It was the last release of Mahesh Bhatt as a director until the release of Sadak 2 (2020). The film borrows its plot idea from the 1993 film Point of No Return, which in turn is a remake of the French film La Femme Nikita, where Bridget Fonda essays a role which is very similar to that character of Sanjay Dutt. The film was partly remade in Tamil as Paramasivan (2006).

Plot
A cop ACP Jay Suryavanshi (Jackie Shroff) trains a criminal Raja (Sanjay Dutt) to eliminate underworld don Jagat Jogia (Gulshan Grover).
Jay performs a surgery and implants a transmitter in Raja's leg when the latter meets with an accident. So wherever Raja travels, Jay can track his movements (even when he is in the UK). Raja falls in love with Mini (Manisha Koirala), even though he was not 'allowed' to fall in love by Jay. Raja kills Jagat Jogia and his gang and is finally set free by Jay and lives with Mini happily ever after.

Cast

 Sanjay Dutt as Raja/Jeet Balraj
 Jackie Shroff as ACP Jay Suryavanshi
 Manisha Koirala as Manpreet "Mini" Kaur
 Gulshan Grover as Jagat Jogia
 Jaspal Bhatti as Mini's Uncle
 Jack Gaud as Jack, Jagat's assistant
 Razak Khan as Cameo Comedian
Dimple Inamdar
Shefali Ganguly

Music
Given by Nusrat Fateh Ali Khan, Anu Malik and Bally Sagoo and all the songs are penned by Majrooh Sultanpuri.

References

External links

1999 films
1990s Hindi-language films
Films scored by Anu Malik
Films scored by Nusrat Fateh Ali Khan
Films directed by Mahesh Bhatt
Hindi films remade in other languages
Films about organised crime in India
Indian crime action films
Indian remakes of French films
1990s crime action films
1999 action thriller films
Indian action thriller films
Films about contract killing in India